The Federal Reserve Bank of Dallas covers the Eleventh Federal Reserve District, which includes Texas, northern Louisiana and southern New Mexico, a district sometimes referred to as the Oil Patch.
The Federal Reserve Bank of Dallas is one of 12 regional Reserve Banks that, along with the Board of Governors in Washington, D.C., make up the nation's central bank. The Dallas Fed is the only one where all external branches reside in the same state (although the region itself includes northern Louisiana as well as southern New Mexico).
The Dallas Fed has branch offices in El Paso, Houston, and San Antonio.
The Dallas bank is located at 2200 Pearl St. in the Uptown neighborhood of Oak Lawn, just north of downtown Dallas and the Dallas Arts District.
Prior to 1992, the bank was located at 400 S. Akard Street, in the Government District in Downtown Dallas. The older Dallas Fed building, which opened in 1921, was built in the Beaux-arts style, with large limestone structure with massive carved eagles and additional significant detailing; it is a City of Dallas Designated Landmark structure. The current Dallas Fed building, opened in September 1992, was designed by three architectural firms: Kohn Pedersen Fox Associates, New York; Sikes Jennings Kelly & Brewer, Houston; and John S. Chase, FAIA, Dallas and Houston, Dallas-based Austin Commercial Inc. served as project manager and general contractor.

Board of Directors 

The following people serve on the Board of Directors :

Class A 
(Elected by member banks to represent member banks)

Class B 
(Elected by member banks to represent the public)

Class C 
(Appointed by the Federal Reserve Board of Governors to represent the public)

History 

Dallas was selected in 1914 to be the headquarters of the Eleventh District, in a somewhat surprising move.  Originally, New Orleans was considered the favorite; however, while both cities had similarly sized banking operations, Dallas' activity had increased significantly while New Orleans' remained relatively flat, and therefore Dallas was chosen.

Branches 
 Federal Reserve Bank of Dallas El Paso Branch
 Federal Reserve Bank of Dallas Houston Branch
 Federal Reserve Bank of Dallas San Antonio Branch

Current Activity 

The Dallas Fed is the nation's central processor for Treasury coupons and manages the national Electronic Transfer Account program, processes checks for federal benefit recipients.
The Dallas Fed also focused on research dealing with maquiladoras and other U.S.-Mexico border economics.

The current president is Lorie K. Logan, who assumed office in August 2022. Logan succeeded Robert Steven Kaplan, who resigned in October 2021.

See also 

 Federal Reserve Act
 Federal Reserve System
 Federal Reserve Bank
 Federal Reserve Districts
 Federal Reserve Branches
 Structure of the Federal Reserve System
 Federal Reserve Bank of Dallas El Paso Branch
 Federal Reserve Bank of Dallas Houston Branch
 Federal Reserve Bank of Dallas San Antonio Branch

References

External links 

Dallas Fed home page
Map of the District

Dallas
Federal Reserve Bank buildings
Buildings of the United States government in Texas
Kohn Pedersen Fox buildings
Economy of Dallas
Economy of the Southwestern United States